What's in a Name? may refer to:

 Dave Dee, Dozy, Beaky, Mick & Tich (album) (also What's in a Name), the debut self-titled album by Dave Dee, Dozy, Beaky, Mick & Tich
 What's in a Name? (1934 film), a British comedy
 What's in a Name? (2012 film), a French-Belgian comedy
 What's in a Name? (play), a 2010 French comedy
 "What's in a Name?" (short story), a mystery short story by American writer Isaac Asimov
 What's in a Name? (Hercules: The Legendary Journeys), a 1995 TV episode